Once Upon a Small Town is a 2022 South Korean streaming television series directed by Kwon Seok-jang and starring Park Soo-young, Choo Young-woo, Jung Suk-yong and Baek Seong-cheol. Adapted from a web novel by Park Ha-min, this KakaoTV original series is a romantic comedy depicting Seoul veterinarian Han Ji-yul unexpectedly being thrown into a rural village and meeting local police officer Ahn Ja-young. The first episode was released on September 5, 2022 on KakaoTV, and a new episode followed every Monday, Tuesday and Wednesday at 19:00 (KST) for four weeks. The series is also available for streaming worldwide on Netflix.

Synopsis
Han Ji-yul, a veterinarian from Seoul relocates to Heedong village against his will. Here he meets a policewoman, Ahn Ja-young, a town insider with a friendly secret, and a local 'nuclear man' Lee Sang-hyeon. Han Ji-yul dreams of escaping Heedong village as soon as possible.

Cast

Main
 Park Soo-young as Ahn Ja-young, a local 3rd-year police officer and town insider.
 Choo Young-woo as Han Ji-yul, a veterinarian, who comes from Seoul to take over the village veterinary hospital run by his grandfather. 
 Baek Seong-cheol as Lee Sang-hyeon, a young farmer, who runs a peach farm in Heedong village.

Supporting

People around Han Ji-yul
 Na Chul as Choi Yun-hyeong, a veterinarian who runs an animal hospital in Seoul.
 Park Ye-ni as Young-Sook, a veterinary nurse.
 Ha Yul-ri as Choi Min, ex-girlfriend of Han Ji-yul, who is a laboratory animal veterinarian at a foreign pharmaceutical company.
 Lee Dong-chan as grandfather Deok-jin, a veterinarian.

People in Heedong village
 Jung Suk-yong as Hwang Man-seong.
 Baek Ji-won as Choi Se-ryun.
 Park Ji-ah as Cha Yeon-hong, general secretary of the women's association in Heedong village.
 Yoo Yeon as Kyeong-ok, Mysterious woman with fierce eyes 
 Roh Jae-won as Yoon Geun-mo, a police officer in Heedong village.
 Kim Young-sun as Mal-geum, the chairman of Majeong-ri, the village next to Heedong-ri, is patriotic for the initiative to tackle village affairs. 
 Jung Si-yul as Kim Seon-dong

Production

The series is directed by respected PD Kwon Seok-jang. Initially Choi Soo-young and Jang Keun-suk were offered lead roles in the series in August 2021. Later in September 2021, it was reported that it didn't work. In May 2022, Choo Young-woo as Han Ji-yul, the native Seoul veterinarian, and Park Soo-young as Ahn Ja-young, the local police officer were confirmed as the male and female leads in the series. Baek Seong-cheol joined the cast later in May as Lee Sang-hyeon, a handsome young farmer.

Since the series was shot in rural environment involving animals, the production team created a safe environment, with the advice of veterinarians, from the script writing process till the actual filming. The entire filming, where animals were present, was done in the presence of a veterinarian and a professional trainer. The production team revealed, "All props that come into contact with animals were specially made of silicone to ensure safety, and anything that could be harmful was excluded as much as possible."

Reception 
Once Upon a Small Town reached the Netflix Global Top 10 list of the most-watched TV (Non-English) and entered the Netflix Top 10 in 33 countries. The series also reached the Top 10 of the OTT Integrated Ranking, which includes all platforms. "The drama has been well received and is expected to rise in the future along with the effect of the global OTT platform." 

The series received positive reviews from critics and viewers for its acting, screenplay, and directing. Time magazine praised Once Upon a Small Town and selected it as one of the 10 best Korean dramas of 2022 to watch on Netflix. Rolling Stone India chose Once Upon a Small Town as one of the Top 10 best Korean romantic comedies of 2022.

Original soundtrack

Part 1

Part 2

Episodes

References

External links
  
 
 
 

KakaoTV original programming
South Korean web series
South Korean comedy television series
South Korean romance television series
Television shows based on South Korean novels
2022 South Korean television series debuts
2022 South Korean television series endings 
2022 web series debuts
2022 web series endings 
Korean-language Netflix exclusive international distribution programming